Janák (feminine Janáková) is a Czech surname. Notable people with the surname include:

 František Janák, Czech artist
 Jiří Janák, Czech racing driver
 Karel Janák, Czech film director
 Mária Janák, Hungarian javelin thrower
 Pavel Janák, Czech architect

Czech-language surnames